Mark Henry Johnson  (born 1960) is a British cognitive neuroscientist who, since October 2017, has been Professor of Experimental Psychology and Head of the Department of Psychology at the University of Cambridge. He is a Fellow of the Association for Psychological Science.

Education
Johnson was educated at the University of Edinburgh (BSc) and the University of Cambridge where his PhD was supervised by Patrick Bateson. He was a postgraduate student at King's College, Cambridge.

Career and research
In 1996, Johnson co-authored, (with Jeffrey Elman, Annette Karmiloff-Smith, Elizabeth Bates, Domenico Parisi, and Kim Plunkett), the book Rethinking Innateness, which examines neural network approaches to development. In the book, Elman et al. propose that genetic information might provide "constraints" on how a dynamic network responds to the environment during learning. For example, they suggest that a learning system can be seen as being subject to architectural constraints during development, an idea that gave birth to the neural network field of constructivist modelling. Rethinking Innateness has received more than 1,500 citations, and was nominated as one of the "One hundred most influential works in cognitive science from the 20th Century" (Minnesota Millennium Project).

Johnson has gone on to develop an Interactive Specialization approach to development, that views cognitive brain development as a series of back-propagated interactions between genetics, brain, body and environment. This model of cognitive development emphasises that development is a stochastic, network-based, interactive process. As such, it echoes contemporary work in other areas of development, such as probabilistic epigenesis and gene regulatory networks.

In 2007, Johnson co-authored (with Denis Mareschal, Sylvain Sirois, Michael Spratling, Michael Thomas and Gert Westermann) Neuroconstructivism, which discusses the relationship between cognition, the brain and the environment. Specifically, they argue that "the brain acquires and develops multiple, fragmentary representations that are just sufficient for on-the-fly processing" and that these representations "serve to cause behaviours rather than to mirror the environment." Volume 2 contains a variety of neural network models that investigate how these representations change during learning (including models from Randy O’Reilly, Matthew Schlesinger and Yuko Munakata).

Johnson specialises in the development of the brain networks subserving social cognition. He is the author of more than 200 papers, and has written or edited seven books, most notably his textbook Developmental Cognitive Neuroscience He serves, with Denis Mareschal, as co-editor of the journal Developmental Science.

References

1960 births
Living people
Developmental psychologists
British cognitive neuroscientists
Carnegie Mellon University faculty
Academics of Birkbeck, University of London
Fellows of the British Academy
Fellows of the Association for Psychological Science